Samuel Garcia (born 2 October 1975 in Tahiti) is a former footballer who played as a defender. He is currently head coach for AS Vénus in the Tahiti First Division. In May 2019 he was appointed head coach of the Tahiti national football team.

International goals

References

External links
 

1975 births
French Polynesian footballers
Living people
1998 OFC Nations Cup players
2000 OFC Nations Cup players
2002 OFC Nations Cup players
2004 OFC Nations Cup players
Tahiti international footballers
Association football defenders